Gungwiller is a commune in the Bas-Rhin department in Grand Est in north-eastern France.

Geography
Positioned to the north-west of Phalsbourg on the road towards the Saarland, Gungwiller is a one-street village surrounded by farmland.

See also
 Communes of the Bas-Rhin department

References

Communes of Bas-Rhin
Bas-Rhin communes articles needing translation from French Wikipedia